Belatucadros or Belatucadrus, was a deity worshipped in Celtic northern Britain, particularly in Cumberland and Westmorland. In the Roman period he was identified with Mars and appears to have been worshipped by lower-ranked Roman soldiers as well as by Britons. In five inscriptions he is called Mars Belatucadrus and the name is frequently translated as "fair shining one" or "fair slayer."

Belatucadros is known from approximately 28 inscriptions in the vicinity of Hadrian's Wall. Dedications to Balatocadrus, Balatucadrus, Balaticaurus, Balatucairus, Baliticaurus, Belatucairus, Belatugagus, Belleticaurus, Blatucadrus and Blatucairus are generally accepted as variants of the most common of these forms: Belatucadrus. Altars dedicated to him were usually small, simple and plain, leading to the suggestion that this god was mainly worshipped by people of low social status. His name never appears with a female consort and there is no certain extant representation of him.

Ross suggests that his name, and that of a similar local god, Cocidius, may be epithets for a common general type of Celtic horned god. A horned head was found near the shrine of Belatucadros at Netherby, Cumbria but cannot be securely identified with the god.

References

Sources

Further reading 

 

Celtic gods
War gods
Martian deities
Gods of the ancient Britons